École Japonaise Complémentaire de Genève (ジュネーブ日本語補習学校 Junēbu Nihongo Hoshū Gakkō) is a Japanese supplementary school held in Geneva, Switzerland.

The school holds classes on Tuesday through Saturday.

References

Further reading

 Harayama-Kadokura, Yuko (原山 優子 Harayama Yūko). Evaluation de l'école japonaise complémentaire de Genève et son avenir (Licentiate thesis). 2/89/24. See profile at Google Books. See entry in the UNIGE directory LISTE DES MEMOIRES DE LICENCE ET DES DEA ET DESS EN SCIENCES DE L’EDUCATION (September 2009) on PDF p. 108/218 (Archive) - See profile at RERO
 - Made by former employees
 古城 仁秀 (前ジュネーブ日本語補習学校:熊本県八代市立八竜小学校). "ジュネーブ日本語補習学校での実践 (第7章 学校経営)" (Archive). 在外教育施設における指導実践記録 32, 147–150, 2009-10-12. Tokyo Gakugei University. See profile at CiNii.
 吉川 哲也 (前ジュネーブ補習授業校校長; 愛知県愛西市立佐屋中学校校長). "ジュネーブ補習授業校における現地の教育事情と学校運営" (Archive). Tokyo Gakugei University.

External links
  École Japonaise complémentaire de Genève
   (2001-2005)
   (1998-2000)

Geneva
Japonaise
Geneva